Bid Qatar or Bidqatar may refer to:
Bid Qatar-e Bon Rud, Fars Province
Bid Qatar-e Olya, Lorestan Province
Bid Qatar-e Sofla, Lorestan Province